The 1970 Kansas gubernatorial election was held on November 3, 1970. Incumbent Democrat Robert Docking defeated Republican nominee Kent Frizzell with 54.3% of the vote.

Primary elections
Primary elections were held on August 4, 1970.

Republican primary

Candidates
Kent Frizzell, Attorney General of Kansas
Rick Harman, businessman
Raymond J. Vanskiver
Donald Conard
Joseph Lindahl

Results

General election

Candidates
Major party candidates
Robert Docking, Democratic
Kent Frizzell, Republican 

Other candidates
P. Everett Sperry, Independent
Marshall Uncapher, Prohibition

Results

References

1970
Kansas
November 1970 events in the United States